Joe Hughes may refer to:

Joe Hughes (baseball) (1880–1951), baseball player for the Chicago Cubs
Joe Hughes (footballer) (1898–?), Welsh professional footballer
Joe Hughes (British Army soldier) (died 1946), British recipient of the George Cross
Joe "Guitar" Hughes (1937–2003), American blues musician
Joe Hughes (boxer) (born 1990), British boxer

See also
Joseph Hughes (disambiguation)